Collège Notre-Dame de Jamhour is a private Catholic primary and secondary school, located in Jamhour, in the Baabda District of the Mount Lebanon Governorate, Lebanon. The co-educational French-language school was founded by the Society of Jesus.

Overview 
The school campus is set in a pine forest and includes Petit Collège, Grand collège, a church, and a sports complex. Before the late 1950s, the campus was located on Rue Huvelin in Beirut. Notre-Dame offers French and Lebanese baccalaureate programs with specializations in mathematics (Sciences générales), biology (Sciences de la vie), economics, social sciences (ES), and humanities (H). Language classes include French, Arabic, English, and Spanish/Italian (optional).

Jamhour was founded in Ghazir and is still run by Jesuit priests. It welcomes students from "douzième" (equivalent of kindergarten) to "Terminale" (12th grade). It is affiliated with Collège Saint-Grégoire in Achrafieh, Beirut, and has close ties and a common history with the Université Saint-Joseph (USJ).

Notable alumni

 Alain Bejjani, CEO of Majid Al Futtaim Group
 Bechara Boutros al-Rahi, Maronite Patriarch
 Michel Eddé, Former Minister of telecommunications, culture, higher education. Chairman of L'Orient-Le Jour
 Bachir Gemayel, President of the Lebanese Republic
 Amine Gemayel, President of the Lebanese Republic
 Carlos Ghosn, Former CEO of Nissan-Renault
 Philippe Jabre, founder and CIO of Jabre Capital Partners, S.A.
 Joseph Philippe Karam, a modernist architect
 Adnan Kassar, chairman of Fransabank
 Nassib Lahoud, MP in the Lebanese Parlement
 Pierre Lequiller, MP in the French Assemblée Nationale
 Amin Maalouf, famous French author and member of the Académie française
 Ziad Rahbani, musician, playwright, thinker.
 Joe Saddi, Senior Partner and Chairman of Strategy&'s (formerly Booz & Company) Middle East business
 Riad Salameh, President of Lebanon's central bank
 Gabriel Yared, music composer

See also

 Catholic Church in Lebanon
 Education in Lebanon
 Education in the Ottoman Empire
 List of Jesuit schools

References

External links
 School website
 School official Facebook page

French international schools in Lebanon
Jesuit secondary schools in Lebanon
Jesuit primary schools in Lebanon